Graeme Ross (born 5 February 1955) is an Australian former cricketer. He played seven first-class cricket matches for Victoria between 1978 and 1980.

See also
 List of Victoria first-class cricketers

References

External links
 

1955 births
Living people
Australian cricketers
Victoria cricketers
Cricketers from Geelong